James Joseph Gandolfini Jr. (September 18, 1961 – June 19, 2013) was an American actor. He was best known for his portrayal of Tony Soprano, the Italian-American Mafia crime boss in HBO's television series The Sopranos. For this role, he won three Emmy Awards, five Screen Actors Guild Awards, and one Golden Globe Award. His role as Tony Soprano has been described as one of the greatest and most influential performances in television history.

Gandolfini's film roles include mob henchman Virgil in True Romance (1993), Lieutenant Bobby Dougherty in Crimson Tide (1995), Colonel Winter in The Last Castle (2001), and Mayor of New York in The Taking of Pelham 123 (2009). Other roles are enforcer and stuntman Bear in Get Shorty (1995) and impulsive "Wild Thing" Carol in Where the Wild Things Are (2009). For his performance as Albert in Enough Said (2013), Gandolfini posthumously received much critical praise and several awards, including a Screen Actors Guild Award nomination and the Boston Society of Film Critics Award for Best Supporting Actor.

In 2007, Gandolfini produced Alive Day Memories: Home from Iraq, a documentary in which he interviewed injured Iraq War veterans and in 2010, Wartorn: 1861–2010 examining the impact of post-traumatic stress disorder on soldiers and families throughout several wars in U.S. history from 1861 to 2010. In addition to Alive Day Memories, he also produced the television film Hemingway & Gellhorn (2012), which gained him a Primetime Emmy Award for Outstanding Limited Series nomination. In 2013, Gandolfini died of a heart attack in Rome at the age of 51.

Early life
Gandolfini was born in Westwood, New Jersey, on September 18, 1961. His mother, Santa (née Penna), was a high school food service worker of Italian descent who was born in the United States and raised in Naples. His Italian-born father, James Joseph Gandolfini Sr. (born Giacomo Giuseppe Gandolfini) a native of Borgo Val di Taro (in the Northeastern Italian region of Emilia-Romagna), worked as a bricklayer and cement mason and later was the head custodian at Paramus Catholic High School. James Sr. earned a Purple Heart in World War II. The elder Gandolfini would purchase car tires from a shop owned by Salvatore Travolta, the father of John Travolta.  Consequently, James Jr. and Travolta became friends and would later act together in five films.  Gandolfini's parents were devout Catholics who spoke Italian at home. Due to the influence of his parents, he developed a strong sense of Italian-American identity and visited Italy regularly. He had two sisters.

Gandolfini grew up in Park Ridge, New Jersey, and graduated from Park Ridge High School in 1979, where he played basketball, acted in school plays, and was awarded the title "Class Flirt" in his senior yearbook. He earned a BA in Communications from Rutgers University-New Brunswick in 1983, where he worked as a bouncer at an on-campus pub. He also worked as a bartender and club manager in Manhattan prior to his acting career. He was introduced to acting while living in New York City, when he accompanied his friend Roger Bart to a Meisner technique acting class. He studied for two years under Kathryn Gately at The Gately Poole Conservatory.

Career

Early acting career (1983–1999)
After graduating from Rutgers and acting school, Gandolfini worked various jobs in Manhattan while acting in small-budget films. He made his Broadway theatre debut in the production of A Streetcar Named Desire as Steve Hubbell. He also appeared in the 1995 Broadway production of On the Waterfront as Charley Malloy. His first film role was in a 1989 New York University student film titled Eddy. One of his earlier major film roles was that of Virgil, a brutal mob enforcer, in the romantic thriller True Romance (1993). Gandolfini stated that one of his major inspirations for his character was an old friend of his who was a hitman. Despite disappointing box office numbers, Gandolfini's performance received critical praise. He was subsequently cast as insurance salesman and Russian mobster Ben Pinkwater in the action film Terminal Velocity (1994). In 1995 he played United States Navy Lieutenant Bobby Dougherty in the submarine film Crimson Tide. In that same year he played Bear, a bearded ex-stuntman with a Southern accent, in Get Shorty (1995). The film, which was based on the book of the same name and directed by Barry Sonnenfeld, received positive critical reception. The cast received a Screen Actors Guild Award nomination for Outstanding Performance by a Cast in a Motion Picture. He was cast as a mob enforcer with a conscience in the legal thriller film The Juror (1996). Despite the film receiving negative critical response, Gandolfini's role was positively received.

The Sopranos (1999–2007)

In 1995 television writer and producer David Chase pitched the original idea for The Sopranos to multiple television networks, including commercial broadcast networks Fox and CBS, before premium network HBO picked it up. The series revolves around Tony Soprano, a New Jersey-based Italian-American mobster, who tries to balance his family life with his role as boss of the Soprano crime family. Gandolfini was invited to audition for the part of Tony Soprano after casting director Susan Fitzgerald saw a short clip of his performance in True Romance, ultimately receiving the role ahead of several other actors including Steven Van Zandt and Michael Rispoli. Chase, in a 2013 interview with The Guardian, stated Gandolfini stopped and left in the middle of his audition before finishing it in his garage later that night. According to Chase, Gandolfini said that he "didn't prepare right" for the audition.

The show debuted in 1999 and was broadcast until 2007 with Gandolfini playing Tony Soprano throughout all six seasons. His portrayal of Tony Soprano was met with widespread fan and critical acclaim. Deadline Hollywood said Tony Soprano helped "usher in the era of the antihero" for television. As methods to focus anger into his performances, Gandolfini had said he would deliberately hit himself on the head, stay up all night to evoke the desired reaction, drink several cups of coffee, or walk around with a rock in his shoe. For his depiction of Soprano, Gandolfini won three Primetime Emmy Awards for Outstanding Lead Actor in a Drama Series and a Golden Globe Award for Best Actor – Television Series Drama. He also won a Screen Actors Guild Award for Outstanding Performance by an Ensemble in a Drama Series along with the rest of the cast. In 2017, Entertainment Weekly listed him as the 42nd Greatest TV Icon of All Time. Gandolfini was making $1million per episode during the show's final season, making him one of television's highest paid actors. Gandolfini underwent knee surgery on June 2, 2006, which pushed the production of the second part of the final season back by several months. Following Gandolfini's death in 2013, David Chase in a Fresh Air interview said that, "without Jim Gandolfini, there is no Sopranos. There is no Tony Soprano."

While working on The Sopranos, Gandolfini appeared in more films. In 2001, he played Winston Baldry, a gay hitman, in the adventure comedy film The Mexican. Gandolfini was recommended for the role by co-star Brad Pitt. For his performance, he won the Best Performance by an Actor in a Supporting Role at the 2002 Outfest Outie Awards in Los Angeles, California. Gandolfini also starred in the action drama film The Last Castle that same year. In 2006, he starred in the musical romance comedy film Romance & Cigarettes. Director and friend John Turturro stated that he wanted Gandolfini to star in the film; however, he had to wait until The Sopranos stopped filming. He also appeared in a 2002 episode of Sesame Street, and a 2004 episode of Saturday Night Live (which, while called "New Jersey Resident", was a take on Tony Soprano) commenting on the Jim McGreevey sex scandal.

Later work (2007–2013)
After the finale of The Sopranos, Gandolfini, along with Paramount Pictures executive Alex Ryan, founded production company Attaboy Films. The production company signed a deal with HBO in 2006 to develop original programming for the channel. In 2007, Gandolfini and HBO produced Alive Day Memories: Home from Iraq, a documentary focused on injured Iraq War veterans. The documentary was nominated for a Primetime Emmy Award for Outstanding Documentary or Nonfiction Special, ultimately losing to Autism: The Musical.

He returned to the stage in 2009, appearing in Broadway's God of Carnage with Marcia Gay Harden, Hope Davis, and Jeff Daniels. He received a Tony Award nomination in the category of Best Performance by a Leading Actor in a Play for his role in the play but lost to Geoffrey Rush, who played the lead in Exit the King. The same year, he played the Mayor of New York in the remake of action thriller film The Taking of Pelham 123. Gandolfini voiced Carol, one of the titular Wild Things, in the fantasy film Where the Wild Things Are. The film, which was based on Maurice Sendak's picture book of the same name, was directed by Spike Jonze.

In 2010 Gandolfini produced another documentary with HBO, which analyzed the effects of posttraumatic stress disorder throughout American history, from 1861 to 2010. The film, titled Wartorn: 1861–2010, featured interviews with American military officials on their views of PTSD and how they are trying to help soldiers affected by it. The documentary, which had its premiere at The Pentagon, received favorable reviews. Gandolfini was also executive producer of the HBO film about Ernest Hemingway and his relationship with Martha Gellhorn, titled Hemingway & Gellhorn (2012). The film premiered at the 2012 Cannes Film Festival to mixed reviews. Despite the reviews, the film was nominated for a Primetime Emmy Award for Outstanding Miniseries or Movie. In 2012, Gandolfini reunited with The Sopranos creator David Chase for Not Fade Away, a music-driven production set in 1960s New Jersey, and the latter's feature film debut.

Two films which he completed before his death on June 19, 2013, were released posthumously. The first was Enough Said, a romantic comedy in which he co-starred with Julia Louis-Dreyfus. The film was met with positive reviews, particularly for Gandolfini's performance. He received posthumous Best Supporting Actor awards from the Boston Society of Film Critics and the Chicago Film Critics Association as well as multiple nominations, including a nomination for the Screen Actors Guild Award for Outstanding Performance by a Male Actor in a Supporting Role. His final film performance was in The Drop, a crime drama in which he co-starred with Tom Hardy and Noomi Rapace. Released September 12, 2014, the film was met with positive critical reviews.

Gandolfini is credited as an executive producer on the HBO miniseries The Night Of which premiered in 2016. Gandolfini was set to star in the miniseries when it was pitched to HBO in 2013, but the network ultimately decided not to go ahead with the show. HBO reversed its decision a few months later, and the show was green-lit, with Gandolfini still set to star; however, he died before filming began. Actor John Turturro assumed the role intended for Gandolfini.

Personal life
Gandolfini maintained ties with his hometown, Park Ridge, New Jersey, and supported the Octoberwoman Foundation for Breast Cancer Research. He lived in New York City and owned a piece of land on the Lake Manitoba Narrows. Gandolfini lived on a  property in Chester Township, New Jersey. In 2009, he purchased a home in the hills of Tewksbury Township, New Jersey. Brett Martin, in a GQ article, said "In interviews, which the actor did his very best to avoid, the actor would often fall back on some version of 'I'm just a dumb, fat guy from Jersey.

Gandolfini and his first wife, Marcy Wudarski, were married in March 1999, and divorced in December 2002. They have a son, Michael. On August 30, 2008, after two years of dating, Gandolfini married former model and actress Deborah Lin in her hometown of Honolulu, Hawaii. They have a daughter, Liliane.

Death
Gandolfini died suddenly at the age of 51 in Rome on June 19, 2013. He was expected to travel to Sicily a few days later to receive an award at the Taormina Film Fest. After he and his family had spent the day sightseeing in the sweltering heat, his 14-year-old son Michael discovered him unconscious at around 10p.m. on the bathroom floor at the Boscolo Exedra Hotel. Michael called reception, who in turn called emergency paramedics. Gandolfini arrived at the hospital at 10:40 p.m. and was pronounced dead 20 minutes later. An autopsy confirmed that he died of a heart attack.

While word of his death spread, state and national politicians took to the internet to pay tribute to Gandolfini. Governor Chris Christie ordered all New Jersey State buildings to fly flags at half staff on June 24 to honor Gandolfini when his body was returned to the United States. The day after Gandolfini's death, Bruce Springsteen and the E Street Band, which has long featured Sopranos co-star Steven Van Zandt on guitar, dedicated a performance of their classic album Born to Run by doing a rendition for Gandolfini.

Gandolfini's body was returned to the United States on June 23. The marquee lights of Broadway theaters were dimmed on the night of June 26 in Gandolfini's honor. Gandolfini's funeral service was held on June 27, 2013, at the Cathedral of St. John the Divine in Morningside Heights, Manhattan, New York City. He was cremated, with his ashes given to his family.

Influence and legacy
TV Guide published a special tribute to Gandolfini in its July 1, 2013, issue following his death, devoting the entire back cover of that issue to his image. In it, columnist Matt Roush cited Gandolfini's work as Tony Soprano as an influence on subsequent cable TV protagonists, saying: "Without Tony, there's no Vic Mackey of The Shield, no Al Swearengen of Deadwood, no Don Draper of Mad Men (whose creator, Matthew Weiner, learned his trade as a writer on The Sopranos)." Similar testimonials were given by his co-stars and colleagues, including Edie Falco, who expressed shock and devastation at his death; Sopranos creator David Chase, who praised him as a "genius"; Bryan Cranston, who stated that his Breaking Bad character Walter White would not have existed without Tony Soprano; and Gandolfini's three-time co-star Brad Pitt, who expressed admiration for Gandolfini as a "ferocious actor, a gentle soul and a genuinely funny man". Emily Nussbaum, writing for The New Yorker, said that "nobody could be under any illusion about what a television actor was capable of" after Gandolfini's portrayal of Tony Soprano. The Atlantic said Gandolfini's influence on television was "seismic," comparing him to film star Marlon Brando. Mark Lawson, writing for The Guardian, said that Gandolfini's performance as Soprano "represents one of the greatest achievements" of television. TV critic Alan Sepinwall said of Gandolfini's performance, "Watching it again, it was very clear to me, quickly and often, that this was the greatest dramatic performance in TV history."

In December 2013, following an online petition campaign started by one of Gandolfini's high school classmate, the borough of Park Ridge, New Jersey gave a section of Park Avenue, the street he grew up on, the nickname "James Gandolfini Way" and signs were installed at the intersection of Park Avenue and Kinderkamack Road at a public ceremony attended by several of his former Sopranos co-stars. In December 2013, HBO released a tribute documentary in honor of Gandolfini. The documentary, titled James Gandolfini: Tribute To A Friend, featured co-star interviews and behind-the-scenes footage. Spike Jonze's 2013 Academy Award winning film Her is dedicated to Gandolfini. Jonze and Gandolfini had previously worked together on Where the Wild Things Are. In 2014, Gandolfini was posthumously inducted into the New Jersey Hall of Fame. In 2019, his son Michael was cast as the younger version of James' character Tony Soprano in The Sopranos prequel film The Many Saints of Newark. Michael watched the show for the first time to prepare for the role, describing it as an intense process.

In May 2022, the Montvale service area on the Garden State Parkway was named for Gandolfini. The re-naming was part of a project that honored several New Jersey residents prominent in the arts, entertainment, and sports.

Filmography

Film

Television

Stage

Video games

Awards and nominations

Notes

References

External links

 
 
 

1961 births
2013 deaths
20th-century American male actors
21st-century American male actors
American male film actors
American male voice actors
American male stage actors
American male television actors
American people of Italian descent
Best Drama Actor Golden Globe (television) winners
Male actors from New Jersey
Male actors from New York City
Method actors
New Jersey Hall of Fame inductees
Outstanding Performance by a Lead Actor in a Drama Series Primetime Emmy Award winners
Outstanding Performance by a Male Actor in a Drama Series Screen Actors Guild Award winners
Park Ridge High School alumni
People from Chester Township, New Jersey
People from Park Ridge, New Jersey
People from Tewksbury Township, New Jersey
People from Westwood, New Jersey
People of Emilian descent
Rutgers University alumni